SM City Cebu, also known as SM Cebu or sometimes SM Mabolo, and locally as SM City, is a large shopping mall located in Cebu City, Philippines. It is the 4th shopping mall owned and developed by SM Prime Holdings, the country's largest shopping mall owner and developer. It is the company's first shopping mall outside of Metro Manila and the fifth largest shopping mall in the Philippines.

On an average day, more than 100,000 people visit SM City Cebu, with the figure increasing to 140,000 to 150,000 on weekends. Due to Cebu City's position as a transshipment point for the Visayas and Mindanao, and SM City Cebu's location close to the city's port area, the mall attracts a significant number of transient shoppers.

History

Development
It was seen as catering to the broad low- and middle-class shoppers, in contrast to its upscale competitor, the Ayala Corporation-owned Ayala Center Cebu which opened a few months later.

Located in Cebu City's North Reclamation Area, then a quiet and relatively remote part of the city, the mall had Manila-based movie and television stars and entertainers perform free concerts at the mall to attract shoppers. Free jeepney rides to the mall were also offered to fulfill the lack of available public transportation within the area.

Northwing
Construction on SM City Cebu's expansion building, dubbed the Northwing, began in March 2006. The expansion, which was developed at a cost of 1.3 billion (US$30.5 million), was built on the parking lot to the north of the existing building, temporarily decreasing the number of parking spaces by more than 30%. Construction of the Northwing started in April 2006, and opened in November 30, 2007. The first 2 floors are for the mall's expansion, while the 3rd, 4th and 5th floors are for the indoor carpark including the roof deck.

Northwing Expansion
An expansion is planned for the Northwing, which will also include two 20-storey office buildings intended to cater to business process outsourcing companies, as well as a 9-storey building which will house a campus of National University. It is set to be completed by 2025.

Design
SM City Cebu is a seven-level complex namely lower ground floor, upper ground floor, second floor, third floor, fourth floor, fifth floor, and roof deck featuring a total of eight cinemas with seven regular cinemas and one IMAX theater with a total seating capacity of 5,812, a food court, a fully computerized bowling center, 8,000-square meter amusement center, and a 2,000-square meter trade hall. Prior to the addition of the Northwing, it had a car park capacity of 1,629.

The Northwing expansion, opened in 2007, features two floors of retail stores, restaurants, and cafes. It houses more than 200 tenants and caters to a more upscale clientele. The expansion also added three levels of covered parking, and a one level of roof deck parking.

The Cebu North Bus Terminal is currently situated inside the compound opposite the mall's parking area with the lot granted by SM Prime for free for a period of two years, after its lease in its former location in Subangdaku, Mandaue expired in early 2020. It was officially opened on October 12, 2020 with full operations starting on October 15, 2020.

See also
 SM City Consolacion
 SM Seaside

References

External links

SM City Cebu
SM Prime Holding

Shopping malls in Cebu City
Shopping malls established in 1993
SM Prime
1993 establishments in the Philippines
Buildings and structures in Cebu City